Nakhon Sawan School is a state school and provincial school of Nakhon Sawan, Thailand. Founded in 1905 by, in currently, the school has one of schools which large yearly enrolment in the country

History 

In 1958, ministry of education has approved new land which located in teak forest on foot of the hill and be government property in then, 1962, the school was receive budget 800,000 baht for build 2-class wood school building, Nakhon Sawan's people thought must build concrete building better than, then they gave their money for build the first school building and made stone laying ceremony on 21 September 1962, the school made the day as school's birthday

List of director

External links
 

Schools in Nakhon Sawan
Educational institutions established in 1905
1905 establishments in Siam